O Paraíso (English: "The Paradise") is the fifth studio album by Portuguese group Madredeus. It was released on 20 October 1997 by EMI-Valentim de Carvalho.

It is the first Madredeus album with their second lineup, as a quintet, with Carlos Maria Trindade replacing Rodrigo Leão on the keyboards and Fernando Júdice on the acoustic bass replacing Francisco Ribeiro.

Recording 
O Paraíso was recorded and mixed between 28 June and 26 August 1997 at the Condulmer Studios in Venice, Italy. The mastering was done by Tim Young at the Metropolis Studios in London.

Track listing

Personnel 
Credits are adapted from the album's inner notes.

Madredeus

 Teresa Salgueiro – voice
 Pedro Ayres Magalhães – acoustic guitar
 José Peixoto – acoustic guitar
 Carlos Maria Trindade – synthesizers
 Fernando Júdice – acoustic bass

Production

 Pedro Ayres Magalhães – production, mixing, cover project
 Matt Butler – sound engineer
 Maximiliano Bacchin – assistant technician
 Jorge Barata – group's sound engineer
 Tim Young – mastering
 Daniel Blaufuks – artistic direction, photography
 Augusto Brázio – photomontage 
 António Cunha – management

Charts

References 

Madredeus albums
EMI Records albums
1997 albums